Manoel José Dias (25 January 1940 – May 2004), known as Manoelzinho, was a Brazilian footballer.

Personal life 
Dias' grandson Matt Dibley-Dias also became a footballer.

References

1940 births
2004 deaths
Association football forwards
Brazilian footballers
CR Flamengo footballers
Sport Club Corinthians Paulista players
Pan American Games medalists in football
Pan American Games silver medalists for Brazil
Footballers at the 1959 Pan American Games
Medalists at the 1959 Pan American Games